Claire Smith may refer to:
 Claire Smith (archaeologist), Australian archaeologist
 Claire Smith (journalist), American sportswriter
 Claire Smith (equestrian), Canadian equestrian
 Claire Bidwell Smith, American therapist and author
 Claire Elizabeth Smith, British TV host, model and beauty pageant titleholder